Highway M18 is a Ukrainian international highway (M-highway) connecting Kharkiv to the southern coast of Crimea in Yalta. The highway is also has an alternative route (M29) which runs parallel and designed as an expressway between Kharkiv and Novomoskovsk.  The section from Novomoskovsk to Yalta is part of European route E105. The section from Kharkiv to Krasnohrad was previously P51.

The section between Yalta and the border of Crimea belongs to Crimea which has been annexed by Russia in 2014. Russia refers to the section in Crimea as 35A-002.

Main route

Main route and connections to/intersections with other highways in Ukraine.

See also

 Roads in Ukraine
 Ukraine Highways
 International E-road network
 Pan-European corridors

References

External links
 International Roads in Ukraine in Russian
 European Roads in Russian

Roads in Crimea
Roads in Dnipro
Transport in Yalta
Roads in Dnipropetrovsk Oblast
Roads in Kharkiv Oblast
Roads in Kherson Oblast
Roads in Zaporizhzhia Oblast